Chakdaha is a town and a municipality in the Kalyani subdivision of the Nadia district, located in the state of West Bengal, India.

Geography

Location
Chakdaha is a prominent urban local body in the district of Nadia, one of the southern districts of West Bengal. It has an average elevation of 11 meters (36 feet) and is 62 km north of the state capital, Kolkata. It is on National Highway 12 (old number NH 34), an approximate 2-hour drive from Kolkata via the National Highway NH12. Regular public transport operates from Madhyamgram (near Kolkata) to Chakdaha, with low-cost buses running every 20 minutes during the day time.

Area overview
Nadia district is part of the large alluvial plain formed by the Ganges-Bhagirathi system. The Kalyani subdivision has the Bhagirathi/ Hooghly on the west. Topographically, Kalyani subdivision is a part of the Ranaghat-Chakdaha Plain, the low-lying area found in the south-eastern part of the district. The smallest subdivision in the district, area-wise, has the highest level of urbanisation in the district. 76.73% of the population lives in urban areas and 23.27% lives in the  rural areas.

Note: The map alongside presents some of the notable locations in the subdivision. All places marked in the map are linked in the larger full screen map. All the four subdivisions are presented with maps on the same scale – the size of the maps vary as per the area of the subdivision.

Police station
Chadaha's police station has jurisdiction over the Chakdah municipal town and the Chakdaha CD Block. The total area covered by the police station is 351.19 km2, and the population covered is 458,834 (2001 census).

Demographics
In the 2011 census, Chakdaha Urban Agglomeration had a population of 132,855, out of which 67,135 were male, and 65,720 were female. The population of children aged 0–5 was 9,829. The effective literacy rate for those aged 7 and above was 90.95 per cent with male literacy being 93.96% and female literacy being 87.88%.

The following municipality and census towns were part of Chakdaha Urban Agglomeration in 2011 census: Chakdaha (M), Parbbatipur (CT), Gopalpur (CT), Belgharia (CT), Punglia (CT) and Lalpur (P) (CT).

Economy 

Singer Hat is the second largest vegetable market in this state. Both wholesale and retail businesses have developed there. The Economy of Chakdaha and its surrounding region is mostly based on the agriculture and clothing markets. Agriculture was once a major economic contributor, but Chakdaha's economy is now dominated by the service sector as well as the informal sector. Residents of this region work in Kolkata and the neighboring areas. The secondary sector of the economy is almost nonexistent, except for a few small-scale plastic factories.
A large industrial undertaking in Chakdaha is Supreme Paper Mills Ltd., a paper mill which has been producing writing and printing paper since 1996

The IT infrastructure has also begun to prosper in this region.

Education

Chakdaha College, established in 1979, is affiliated to the University of Kalyani. It offers honors courses in Bengali, English, Sanskrit, Economics, History, Political Science, Geography, Physics, Chemistry, Mathematics, Botany, Zoology, and Accountancy. Chakdaha college has since also become a political gathering place.
 There are eight quality English medium Schools like Satish Chandra Memorial School, St.Mary Secondary High School, Broadway Accent High School, Chakdaha Model School and more in the central area of Chakdaha City. And some popular Bengali medium schools in Chakdaha are Chakdaha Ramlal Academy, Basanta Kumari Balika Vidyapith, Purbachal Boys' & Girls' School, Bapuji Vidyamandir (different building for boys and girls) etc.

Healthcare
Chakdah State General Hospital is one of the best state general hospitals in West Bengal, and has 500 beds.

Culture

Festivals 
Durga-puja, like in all other Bengali communities, is the largest and most colorful festival and is celebrated throughout the town. Other festivals like Jagadhhatri Puja, Holi, Rath-yatra, etc. are also popular.
Kali Puja is the famous festival in Chakdaha.

The fiberglass Durga idol made by Anup Goswami, a resident of Chakdaha KBM, will be worshiped at the Bharat Sebashram Ashram in Fiji. The Durga idol, which weighs 300 kg at a height of seven and a half feet, will soon be packed in a ship's container. Along with the Durga idol, 13-foot idols of Shiva, Ganesh, Ramchandra and Hanumanji will also leave at the same time.

Entertainment and sports 
Cultural programs are mostly held in the Sampriti Manch and Chakdaha Pouro Mukto Mancha. Each winter, one large cultural program (better known as melas) takes place in Chakdaha. Since 2014 'Chakdaha Book Fair' has been established. Flower Exhibition is one of the popular events in this town.

Cricket and football are the most popular sports. There is a stadium in Chakdaha.  Indian Woman Cricketer and the leading wicket-taker in ODI cricket Jhulan Goswami hails from Chakdaha.

Transport

The city is connected to the Sealdah railway station through the Chakdaha railway station of Sealdah-Ranaghat Line.  Local and passenger trains are available Shortly. The distance between Kolkata to Chakdaha is 62 km by train. From the Chakdaha railway station, trains travel both North and South. Local trains are available to Ranaghat, Krishnagar, Shantipur, Gede, and Sealdah. A handful of passenger trains between Lalgola and Sealdah also stop at Chakdaha.

The distance between Kolkata to Chakdaha is 69 km by Road. Chakdah has an important & busy Bus Stand which is mainly connected with Chakda-Bongaon road and NH-12 (previously NH-34). It has bus connectivity mainly with Bangaon and it is also connecting with Barasat, Ranaghat, Tehatta, Aishmali, Nimtala, and other parts of Nadia and North 24 pgs district. CSTC, SBST buses plying from Kolkata going to North Bengal also has a stop at Chakdah on NH-34. Buses ply to Krishnanagar, Hanskhali, Palassey, Bethua, Baharampur, and other parts of State. Some long-distance night buses to north Bengal are also available. People in general, though prefer trains because of ready availability and more convenience.

The nearest airport from the town is the Netaji Subhash Chandra Bose International Airport at Dum Dum, 58 km from the town.

See also
Chakdaha (Community development block)

References

Cities and towns in Nadia district